Maes-yr-Uchaf Wood is a small woodland and Site of Special Scientific Interest (SSSI), noted for its biological characteristics, in Monmouthshire, south east Wales.

Geography

The wood is in private ownership and is not open to the public.

Wildlife and ecology
As with other woodland in the Wye Valley Area of Outstanding Natural Beauty, Maes-yr-Uchaf Wood contains many local rare tree species. Maes-yr-Uchaf Wood has an unusual amalgamation of tree species present for Monmouthshire, with ash (Fraxinus excelsior), black alder (Alnus glutinosa) and field maple (Acer campestre) the dominant species.
 
Other plant life found in the woodland are dog's mercury (Mercurialis perennis), herb paris (Paris quadrifolia) and wood-sorrel (Oxalis acetosella).

References

Forests and woodlands of Monmouthshire
Sites of Special Scientific Interest in Monmouthshire
Sites of Special Scientific Interest notified in 1981